Francis Irvine (16 March 1899 – 16 December 1969) was a South African sprinter. He competed in the men's 200 metres at the 1920 Summer Olympics.

References

1899 births
1969 deaths
Athletes (track and field) at the 1920 Summer Olympics
South African male sprinters
Olympic athletes of South Africa
Sportspeople from Johannesburg
South African Republic people